The building of Council of Labor and Defense is a state building located on Okhotny Ryad Street in central Moscow, Russia, 250 meters north of the Kremlin. Since 1994 it serves as the meeting place of the State Duma, the lower house of the Russian parliament. It is alternatively known as State Duma building or the Okhotny Ryad building. It has a regional-level cultural heritage status.

History 
The idea of erecting a large representative building near the House of Unions arose in the mid-1920s. In 1926, a competition was held for the design of the building for the State Bank of the USSR, however, construction on this site was also abandoned and the old Bank building on Neglinnaya Street was reconstructed according to the project of Ivan Zholtovsky. In the early 1930s, simultaneously with the competition for the Mossovet hotel, a competition was announced for the project of the Hotel Intourist on the other side of the street, but soon this project was abandoned and the Soviet authorities decided to build an office building for the Council of Labor and Defense on the site.

To clear a place for the building, despite the objections of art critics, the restored Church of Paraskeva Pyatnitsa and the Golitsyn Chambers of the 17th century were demolished, while the nearby Troyekurov Chambers survived. Without announcing a competition, the design was entrusted to the architect Arkady Yakovlevich Langman, who completed it with the participation of architects S. Sergiyevsky and N. Meziere. By that time, Langman already had experience in the construction of large structures in Moscow: the Dynamo stadium (together with Lazar Cherikover) and the House of the Dynamo society (together with Ivan Fomin).

Langman coordinated the height parameters of the building with the Mossovet hotl — nearly the same height of both buildings was supposed to conceal the large relief difference from Lubyanskaya to Manezhnaya squares and create the illusion of straightness of the front street, running to the new architectural dominant of Moscow - the Palace of the Soviets. Nikita Khrushchev, then head of the city, recalled how the architects discussed the project with the future "owner" of the building Vyacheslav Molotov (chairman of the Labor and Defense Council). Ivan Zholtovsky said that the project is acceptable, but not expressive, and to prove his words, he turned the picture upside down: “Can it be built like this? It is possible, it will not lose anything aesthetically, and no one will notice".

The building of Council of Labor and Defense was built in 1932–35, however, Langman's plan was not fully implemented. According to the initial project, the uniformly designed corps were supposed to form a square and to include the House of the Unions. Criticism from the chief architect of Moscow Sergey Chernyshyov forced to abandon these plans.

Ownership 

In April 1937, two years after the completion of the building, the Council of Labor and Defense was dissolved. In this year's guide to Moscow, the building is listed as the House of the Council of People's Commissars of the USSR. Later, the building belonged to the Council of Ministers of the USSR, and finally to the State Planning Committee. From 1994, the State Duma of the Russian Federation has been working in the building.

In the early 2010s it was planned that after the construction of a new parliamentary center in Mnyovniki, the State Duma building would be demolished to build a hotel or a shopping center in its place. Such plans were announced by businessman Mikhail Gutseriyev.

Overview 
The building plan is symmetrical. The long main and narrow side facades are decorated with high fluted pilasters. The main facade is dissected by two side and central projections. In the central risalit there is a flat entrance portico, which is close in proportion to the columnar portico of the House of the Unions standing nearby. On the front plane of the attic there is a state emblem of the Soviet Union, and on the roof there is a flagpole with the flag of Russia. Stylistically, the design of the State Duma building combines both elements of constructivism, as well as monumentality and representativeness — features inherent to the next period of the Soviet architecture.

By the beginning of the exterior decoration, the deposits of marble-like limestone near Kolomna, turned out to be exhausted, and slabs removed from the Cathedral of Christ the Savior, demolished in 1931, were used instead. The granular plaster covering the internal facade is made of stone chips, which were obtained by grinding marble facings of Moscow churches massively demolished in the 1930s. The same materials were used to decorate the Okhotny Ryad metro station being built at that time, one of the exits of which was originally planned to be placed inside the Building. The three entrance arches are made of labradorite and Karelian granite.

Gallery

References 

Legislative buildings in Europe
Seats of national legislatures
State Duma
Buildings and structures in Moscow
Stalinist architecture
Government buildings completed in 1935